The L.J. Bernard Hardware Store is a historic building in Westwego, Louisiana. It was built in 1907, and remodelled as a hardware store by L. J. Bernard a decade later. It remained in the Bernard family until 1997, and it became a museum in 1999. It has been listed on the National Register of Historic Places since September 22, 2000.

References

National Register of Historic Places in Jefferson Parish, Louisiana
Commercial buildings completed in 1907
1907 establishments in Louisiana